Walnut Creek Metropolitan Park is a  public park in Northeast Austin, Texas. The park features 15 miles of hiking trails, multiple softball fields, a swimming pool, a playground, and numerous barbecue pits and picnic tables. It is notable for having a large off-leash area for dogs, and is also popular with local mountain bikers for its extensive network of trails. The park is hilly and wooded, with access to Walnut Creek and the surrounding limestone bluffs.

History
Part of what is now Walnut Creek Metropolitan Park was historically inhabited by the indigenous Tonkawa people, and the area has yielded several archaeological finds.

References

Parks in Austin, Texas